This article contains a list of flags for which the reverse (back ) is different from the obverse (front ). 
It includes current as well as historic flags of both nations and national subdivisions such as provinces, states, territories, cities and other administrations (including a few that are not recognized by the United Nations or whose sovereignty is in dispute). 
When the flag is that of a nation, the Subdivision column is blank ( — ). 

The list below do not includes flags for which the reverse side is congruent (identical ) nor is it a mirror image of the obverse side (horizontally flipped ). Flag sides are usually mirror copy to satisfy manufacturing constraints. 
Identical flags are much less common and contain an element for which a simple mirror image would be problematic, such as text (e.g. The Flag of Saudi Arabia includes the shahada, an Islamic creed) or a geographic feature (e.g. The Flag of the United Nations included an Azimuthal equidistant projection of the earth). 
Flags having a truly different designs on both their sides (two-sided ) differ from the norm. 
The only UN-recognized nation whose present-day flag officially contains a unique image on each side is Paraguay. 

Not all impression of two-sided flags are de facto two-sided because of practical  manufacturing constraints or, judging from how often it was disregarded in practice, some formal concern of heraldic nature. 
As such it may very well be prescribed legally from the very beginning and ever ignored in practice by institutions of every type. 

Many of those flag are reconstructions based on various degree of evidence.

Flags by nation

See also
 Glossary of vexillology
 Vexillology

Citations 

reverse